The Final FRCA is a postgraduate examination in anaesthesia, more fully called the Final Examination of the Diploma of Fellowship of the Royal College of Anaesthetists.

Trainee anaesthetists in the United Kingdom are required to pass this examination during ST3-5 (6 months through ST5), otherwise training may be delayed or stopped.

Admission to the examination
The examination is open to intermediate and higher trainees in anaesthesia, those working in approved training posts, those who have recently left an approved training post, and other doctors on approval of the Royal College of Anaesthetists who have passed the primary FRCA or an equivalent exempting qualification within the last seven years.  There are a maximum of six attempts at this examination, and there is a robust system in place to support candidates in the UK training system before they get to this point.

Form of the examination
The exam takes the form of a written Short-Answer Question (SAQ) paper (3 hours, 12 questions), and a Multiple-Choice Question (MCQ) paper (3 hours, 60 five stem questions covering medicine, surgery, intensive care, pain and basic sciences and 30 Single Best Answer clinical questions)  which can be attempted at several regional centres in the UK (such as Edinburgh, Belfast, Birmingham, Cardiff, Manchester and London).

The Structured Oral Examination (SOE)
Candidates who pass both the MCQ and the SAQ are invited to the Structured Oral Examination (SOE) ("Viva voce"), in Churchill House, London, the headquarters of the Royal College of Anaesthetists.

The SOE component of the examination consists of two structured oral examinations: the first (clinical) consists of 10 minutes to review a prepared series of clinical data, followed by 40 minutes of questioning; the second (basic science) consists of 30 minutes of questioning.

Marking scheme
The examination is now staged into two distinct, separable components.  The written paper must be passed prior to attempting the Structured Oral Examination (SOE).  In the written paper, the marks from the short answer questions paper and the multiple choice questions and single-best answer questions are considered together.  This part of the examination can now be passed independently, leaving the candidate to attempt the SOE without the need to resit the written paper.  The marks from the written paper are no longer considered when attempting the SOE.

To pass the examination, the written paper must be passed in full, followed by an independent pass of the structured oral examination (known commonly as the viva)  

The SOE examinations are usually held over a week.  At the end of each day of SOE examinations, Successful candidates are listed on a board in the lobby of the college by RCoA reference number.  

Approximately half of all candidates pass the examination at each sitting.

Negative marking (the deduction of a point for an incorrect answer) has been removed from the Multiple Choice Question (MCQ) component of the examination from the October 2008 sitting. From October 2010, some MCQ questions will be set according to the "single best answer" format.

Syllabus
The tone of the examination is predominantly clinical. The syllabus is extensive and covers all aspects of clinical anaesthetic practice. In addition, the entire syllabus of the Primary FRCA examination (which is predominantly basic science) is included.

Fellowship
Those who pass the examination are admitted as Fellows of the Royal College of Anaesthetists, and are entitled to use the postnominal "FRCA" after their name. Fellowship may also be bestowed by election from the Council of the College. A ceremony is held annually in London at which new fellows are formally admitted. "Diplomates" are invited to attend, but are admitted as fellows whether or not they do so.

Before the College bestowed its own fellowships, anaesthetists were awarded the FFARCS: Fellowship of the Faculty of Anaesthetists of the Royal College of Surgeons, the forerunner of the Royal College of Anaesthetists.

Similar qualifications
The following are similar qualifications to the FRCA. They are not necessarily equivalent or interchangeable:
FCAI: Fellowship of the College of Anaesthetists of Ireland (formerly termed FFARCSI, Fellowship of the Faculty of Anaesthetists of the Royal College of Surgeons in Ireland).
FANZCA: Fellowship of the Australian and New Zealand College of Anaesthetists.
EDA: European Diploma in Anaesthesiology (and Intensive Care).
FCA (SA): Fellowship of the College of Anaesthetists of the Colleges of Medicine of South Africa.

See also
Royal College of Anaesthetists
Primary FRCA

References

Anesthesiology
Medical education in the United Kingdom